U.S. Route 180 is an east–west United States highway.  Like many three-digit routes, US 180 no longer meets its "parent", US 80. US 80 was decommissioned west of Mesquite, Texas, and was replaced in Texas by Interstate 20 and Interstate 10 resulting in U.S. 180 being 57 miles longer than U.S. 80. The highway's eastern terminus is in Hudson Oaks, Texas (west of Fort Worth, near Weatherford), at an intersection with Interstate 20.  Its western terminus is unclear. Signage at an intersection with State Route 64 in Valle, Arizona 40 miles (64 km) northwest of Flagstaff indicates that the route ends at SR 64, which is consistent with the AASHTO U.S. Highway logs. However, many maps continue the US 180 designation to the south rim of the Grand Canyon at Grand Canyon Village. Signage at the SR 64 intersection as of 2021 indicated that US 180 continues north concurrent with the route. However, no signage along the route exists past this intersection until SR 64 turns east towards Cameron, Arizona. At this intersection, signage makes no mention of US 180 nor is there any mention at the terminus of SR 64 at US 89.

Route description
Four National Parks can be accessed on the highway, Grand Canyon National Park, Petrified Forest National Park, Guadalupe Mountains National Park, and Carlsbad Caverns National Park. It also passes through the San Francisco Peaks, the highest mountains in Arizona.

|-
|AZ
|292
|470
|-
|NM (Southwest)
|248
|399
|-
|TX (Trans-Pecos)
|146
|235
|-
|NM (Southeast)
|110
|180
|-
|TX (Northwest)
|339
|546
|-
|Total
|1135
|1827
|}

Arizona

In Flagstaff, US 180 is concurrent with Interstate 40 Business and historic U.S. Route 66 for a short distance through the city. US 180 joins the former routing of Route 66 in the center of Flagstaff and follows the roadway to where it merges with Interstate 40 east of the city. From the western terminus of the overlap, the intersection with eastbound Interstate 40 is two miles (3 km) to the east, and the intersection with westbound Interstate 40 and with Interstate 17 is three miles (5 km) to the southwest.

US 180 shares numbering with Interstate 40 from Flagstaff, Arizona, to Holbrook, Arizona. At Holbrook, US 180 follows Interstate 40 Business along South Navajo Boulevard.  Shortly after following South Navajo Boulevard, however, US 180 follows a south-southeast route, running by the Petrified Forest National Park and continuing South-Southeast to and through a small branch of the Zuni Indian Reservation, to St. Johns, Apache County, Arizona where it meets U.S. Route 191.  After meeting up with US 191, US 180 continues south to the town of Eagar, Arizona where the two routes enter the Apache National Forest and finally split at the town of Alpine, Arizona, roughly 4–6 miles from the Arizona-New Mexico border.

New Mexico/West Texas (El Paso area)

After entering New Mexico from just east of Alpine, Arizona, US 180 continues south until Silver City, New Mexico. From Silver City, US 180 travels just east for roughly 4–6 miles, meeting up with New Mexico State Road 90, New Mexico State Road 15, and New Mexico State Road 152. From Deming, US 180 follows Interstate 10 through Las Cruces, New Mexico, and enters Texas at Anthony, New Mexico. The route is concurrent with Interstate 10 through the west and central portions of El Paso, Texas, and separates from I-10 at Paisano Drive, joining U.S. Route 62. US 62/180 is concurrent with Montana Avenue in East Central El Paso (after the intersection with Paisano Drive), and continues to be called Montana Avenue until it reaches RM 2775 (Hueco Tanks Road). US 62/180 then travels east, going past the spur RM 2775 (which goes north to Hueco Tanks) through the southern end of the Guadalupe Mountains National Park (90 miles east of El Paso), and past the southern face of Guadalupe Peak (the highest point in Texas) towards New Mexico and Carlsbad Caverns National Park. Continuing though Carlsbad, New Mexico, US 180 and US 62 travels toward Texas running through Hobbs, New Mexico, and exiting New Mexico just east of Hobbs.
US 180 is now a divided highway west of Carlsbad where it used to be a two-lane highway until around 2008. US 180 is a divided highway in the entire state whereas before it was divided only east of Carlsbad.

Texas

After re-entering Texas from just east of Hobbs, New Mexico, US 180 splits from US 62 at Seminole, Texas. US 180 continues eastward running through the towns of: 
Lamesa, Gail, Snyder, Roby, Anson, Albany, and Breckenridge. For the last portion of its length, the road runs through the scenic Palo Pinto Mountains, exiting them at Metcalf Gap.  Towns in this final portion include Palo Pinto, Mineral Wells and Cool.

US 180 comes into contact with Interstate 20 just east of Weatherford, Texas, and ends in Hudson Oaks, Texas.

In Texas, US 180 intersects U.S. Highway 385, U.S. Highway 87, U.S. Highway 84, U.S. Highway 83, U.S. Highway 277, U.S. Highway 283, U.S. Highway 183, U.S. Highway 281, and Interstate 20.

The speed limit is 75 mph in Hudspeth and Culberson counties except through Guadalupe Pass. beginning just over 1/2 mile east of mile marker 52 to the state line at FM 652.

History

U.S. Route 260 (US 260) was a spur of U.S. Route 60, established in 1931. It connected Springerville, Arizona, and Holbrook, Arizona, and replaced the former western end of US 70. In 1935, US 260 was extended eastward to US 80 near Deming, New Mexico. In 1962, the entire route of US 260 became part of a western extension of US 180.

Major intersections
Arizona
  in Valle
  in Flagstaff
  in Flagstaff. The highways travel concurrently to Holbrook.
  in St. Johns. The highways travel concurrently to Alpine.
  in Springerville. The highways travel concurrently through Springerville.
New Mexico
  in Deming. I-10/US 180 travels concurrently to El Paso, Texas. US 70/US 180 travels concurrently to Las Cruces.
  on the Las Cruces–University Park line. US 85/US 180 travels concurrently to El Paso, Texas.
Texas
  in El Paso
  in El Paso. US 62/US 180 travels concurrently to Seminole, with a section in New Mexico in between.
New Mexico
  in Carlsbad. The highways travel concurrently through Carlsbad.
Texas
  in Seminole
  in Lamesa. The highways travel concurrently to south of Los Ybanez.
  in Snyder
  in Anson
  in Albany. The highways travel concurrently through Albany.
  in Breckenridge
  in Mineral Wells
  in Hudson Oaks

Related routes
The parent route of US 180 is U.S. Route 80 which it no longer intersects. U.S. Route 280 and U.S. Route 380 are sibling routes of US 180.

Arizona State Route 180A serves as an alternate spur of US 180 in eastern Arizona.

See also

References

External links

 Endpoints of US highway 180

United States Numbered Highway System
U.S. Highways in New Mexico
U.S. Highways in Arizona
1